Differential dynamic microscopy (DDM) is an optical technique that allows performing light scattering experiments by means of a simple optical microscope. DDM is suitable for typical soft materials such as for instance liquids or gels made of colloids, polymers and liquid crystals but also for biological materials like bacteria and cells.

The basic idea
The typical DDM data is a time sequence of microscope images (movie) acquired at some height within the sample (typically at its mid-plane). If the image intensity is locally proportional to the concentration of particles or molecules to be studied (possibly convoluted with the microscope point spread function (PSF)), each movie can be analyzed in the Fourier space to obtain information about the dynamics of concentration Fourier modes, independent on the fact that the particles/molecules can be individually optically resolved or not. After suitable calibration also information about the Fourier amplitude of the concentration modes can be extracted.

Applicability and working principle
The concentration-intensity proportionality is valid at least in two very important cases that distinguish two corresponding classes of DDM methods:

 scattering-based DDM: where the image is the result of the superposition of the strong transmitted beam with the weakly scattered light from the particles. Typical cases where this condition can be obtained are bright field, phase contrast, polarized microscopes.
 fluorescence-based DDM: where the image is the result of the incoherent addition of the intensity emitted by the particles (fluorescence, confocal) microscopes

In both cases the convolution with the PSF in the real space corresponds to a simple product in the Fourier space, which guarantees that studying a given Fourier mode of the image intensity provides information about the corresponding Fourier mode of the concentration field. In contrast with particle tracking, there is no need of resolving the individual particles, which allows DDM to characterize the dynamics of particles or other moving entities whose size is much smaller than the wavelength of light. Still, the images are acquired in the real space, which provides several advantages with respect to traditional (far field) scattering methods.

Data analysis
DDM is based on an algorithm proposed in and, which is conveniently named Differential Dynamic Algorithm (DDA). DDA works by subtracting images acquired at different times and taking advantage that, as the delay  between two subtracted images gets large, the energy content of the difference image increases correspondingly. A two-dimensional Fast Fourier Transform (FFT) analysis of the difference images allows to quantify the growth of the signal contains for each wave vector  and one can calculate the Fourier power spectrum of the difference images for different delays  to obtain the so-called image structure function . Calculation shows that for both scattering- and fluorescence-based DDM

where  is the normalized intermediate scattering function that would be measured in a Dynamic Light Scattering (DLS) experiment,  the sample scattering intensity that would be measured in a Static Light Scattering (SLS) experiment,  a background term due to the noise along the detection chain  a transfer function that depends on the microscope details. Equation shows that DDM can be used for DLS experiments, provided that a model for the normalized intermediate scattering function is available. For instance, in the case of Brownian motion one has  where  is the diffusion coefficient of the Brownian particles. If the transfer function  is determined by calibrating the microscope with a suitable sample, DDM can be employed also for SLS experiments. Alternative algorithms for data analysis are suggested in.

Running DDM on a series of frames smaller than the full-frame has been called multi-DDM.   This is analogous to changing the scattering volume in a light scattering experiment, but is readily carried out by selecting out of the full-frame movie. The coherence lengthscale of the dynamics can be picked up from a multi-DDM analysis.

Relationship with other imaging-based scattering methods
Scattering-based DDM belongs to the so-called near-field (or deep Fresnel) scattering family, a recently introduced family of imaging-based scattering methods. Near field is used here in a similar way to what is used for near field speckles i.e. as a particular case of Fresnel region as opposed to the far field or Fraunhofer region. The near field scattering family includes also quantitative shadowgraphy and Schlieren.

Applications of DDM
DDM was introduced in 2008 and it was applied for characterizing the dynamics of colloidal particles in Brownian motion. More recently it has been successfully applied also to the study of aggregation processes of colloidal nanoparticles, of bacterial motions, of the dynamics of anisotropic colloids  and of motile cilia.

References 

Scientific techniques
Microscopy
Scattering, absorption and radiative transfer (optics)
Biochemistry methods
Physical chemistry
Spectroscopy